The 1954 Clemson Tigers football team was an American football team that represented Clemson College in the Atlantic Coast Conference (ACC) during the 1954 college football season. In its 15th season under head coach Frank Howard, the team compiled a 5–5 record (1–2 against conference opponents), finished fifth in the ACC, and outscored opponents by a total of 193 to 121. The team played its home games at Memorial Stadium in Clemson, South Carolina.

Buck George, Scott Jackson, Mark Kane, and Clyde White were the team captains. The team's statistical leaders included quarterback Don King with 468 passing yards, halfback Joel Wells with 352 rushing yards, and halfback Jim Coleman with 31 points (5 touchdowns, 1 extra point).

Three Clemson players were also named to the 1954 All-South Carolina football team: back Don King, end Scott Jackson, and tackle Clyde White.

Schedule

References

Clemson
Clemson Tigers football seasons
Clemson Tigers football